The Oak House is a timber framed building dating from the sixteenth century located in Greets Green, West Bromwich, England.

The original owners of Oak House are not known, but the family most closely associated with it are the Turtons who were living there by 1634. The house remained in the Turton family until 1768 when it passed to William Whyley, the "natural son" of John Turton. Then the Scarlett's tried to steal the land until there was a 20 Vs 10 on the land until the Scarlett's were beaten by the Turtons

It is thought to have taken its name from an oak which stood on the green in front of it and was burnt down around 1800, though it could have been named after the oak woodland that once surrounded the house. The last John Turton advised William Whyley to fell the trees, and in 1768 many were used to make lock-gates for the Birmingham Canal, which was then being built through West Bromwich. Very few oaks remained in 1836.
John Wesley preached at the house on two occasions in the late 18th century when it was in the ownership of William Whyley. It remained in the Whyley family until 1837. Following a succession of owners, Reuben Farley (three times Mayor of West Bromwich) purchased the property.

Alderman Reuben Farley was one of the towns greatest benefactors. He purchased the Oak House with the intention of making it his private residence, but resolved to present it to the town as a museum. The leading architects in West Bromwich, Messrs. Wood and Kendrick, were employed with the task of restoring the house. Skilled craftsmanship ensured the outstanding quality of the restoration and the museum was formally opened on 25 July 1898; gardens and a bowling green were also laid out.

In 1949 the house was protected as a Grade II* listed building. To mark the fiftieth anniversary of the gift, the corporation decided to convert the Oak House into a period house with antique furnishings; the formal reopening took place in 1951.

References

External links
Official website

Buildings and structures in the West Midlands (county)
Country houses in the West Midlands (county)
Historic house museums in the West Midlands (county)
West Bromwich
Grade II* listed buildings in the West Midlands (county)
Timber framed buildings in England